William or Billy Agnew may refer to:

Sir William Agnew, 1st Baronet (1825–1910), English politician
William Agnew (footballer) (1880–1936), Scottish footballer (national team)
Billy Agnew (1898–?), Scottish footballer (Port Vale, Luton Town)
Sir William Agnew (Royal Navy officer) (1898–1960), British admiral